This is a list of notable JavaScript libraries.

Constraint programming 
 Cassowary (software)
 CHR.js

DOM (manipulation) oriented 

 Google Polymer
 Dojo Toolkit
 jQuery
 midori
 MooTools
 Prototype JavaScript Framework

Graphical/visualization (canvas or SVG related) 

 AnyChart
 Babylon.js
 Chart.js
 Cytoscape
 D3.js
 Dojo Toolkit
 FusionCharts
 Google Charts
 Highcharts
 JavaScript InfoVis Toolkit
 JointJS
 p5.js
 Plotly
 Processing.js
 Raphaël
 RGraph
 seen.js
 SWFObject
 Teechart
 Three.js
 Velocity.js
 Verge3D
 Webix

GUI (Graphical user interface) and widget related 

 Angular (application platform) by Google
 AngularJS by Google
 Bootstrap
 Dojo Widgets
 Ext JS by Sencha
 Foundation by ZURB
 jQuery UI
 jQWidgets
 OpenUI5 by SAP
 Polymer (library) by Google
 qooxdoo
 React.js by Facebook
 Vue.js
 Webix
 WinJS
 Svelte

No longer actively developed 
 Glow
 Lively Kernel
 Script.aculo.us
 YUI Library

Pure JavaScript/Ajax 
 Google Closure Library
 Joose
 JsPHP
 Microsoft's Ajax library
 MochiKit
 PDF.js
 Socket.IO
 Spry framework
 Underscore.js

Template systems 
 jQuery Mobile
 Mustache
 Jinja-JS
 Twig.js

Unit testing
 Jest
 Jasmine
 Mocha
 QUnit
 Unit.js

Web-application related (MVC, MVVM) 

 Angular (application platform) by Google
 AngularJS by Google
 Backbone.js
 Echo
 Ember.js
 Enyo
 Express.js
 Ext JS
 Google Web Toolkit
 JavaScriptMVC
 JsRender/JsViews
 Knockout
 Meteor
 Mojito
 MooTools
 Next.js
 OpenUI5 by SAP
 Polymer (library) by Google
 Prototype JavaScript Framework
 PureMVC
 qooxdoo
 React.js
 SproutCore
Vue.js
 Wakanda Framework

Other 
 Blockly
 Cannon.js
 MathJax
 Modernizr
 TensorFlow
 Brain.js

See also
 Ajax framework
 Comparison of JavaScript frameworks

JavaScript library